Ərməki (also, Ermeki and Ermyaki) is a village and municipality in the Quba Rayon of Azerbaijan.  It has a population of 1,582.  The municipality consists of the villages of Ərməki, Digah, and Alıc.

References

External links

Populated places in Quba District (Azerbaijan)